The Haverhill Line (formerly named the Haverhill/Reading Line) is a branch of the MBTA Commuter Rail system, running north from downtown Boston, Massachusetts through the cities and towns of
Malden, Melrose, Wakefield, Reading, Wilmington, Andover, North Andover, Lawrence, and Haverhill.

The service operates on the Western Route of the former Boston and Maine Railroad, which extends north to Portland, Maine, though MBTA commuter rail service has not continued north of Massachusetts since 1967.

History

Early cutbacks

Until 1959, the Boston and Maine Railroad (B&M) operated commuter service along its Western Route from Haverhill and Reading to Boston. In 1959 the section from Reading to Wilmington Junction became freight-only, and Haverhill commuter trains as well as intercity service from New Hampshire and Maine were rerouted over the Wildcat Branch and the lower Lowell Line. Salem Street stop on the Wildcat Branch opened to replace North Wilmington on the mainline. The MBTA was formed in August 1964 to consolidate and fund Boston's transit system. In December 1964, the MBTA signed a contract to subsidize B&M commuter service within the MBTA funding district. On January 4, the B&M discontinued most interstate service, with a single commuter-oriented round trip to Dover, New Hampshire, the only such service remaining on the Western Route. On January 18, the B&M cut back commuter service to the MBTA-subsidized area; the Dover trip was the only service beyond Wilmington, through in-district Reading local service continued. The Wakefield Junction stop on the Reading Line was discontinued at this time.

On June 30, 1967, the B&M ended all interstate service. The Dover trip was cut back to Haverhill, funded by the towns of Haverhill, North Andover, Lawrence, and Andover. The Salem Street stop was discontinued at this time.

In September 1973, the MBTA purchased the Western Route between Somerville and Wilmington Junction, with the intent to replace all Reading Line service with the Haymarket North Extension of the rapid transit Orange Line. However, local opposition to the extension - largely in Melrose, where rapid transit conversion would have required the elimination of grade crossings, possibly blocking important east-west local roads - and funding issues meant that the Orange Line only reached . A single track was retained for Reading Line service to Melrose, Wakefield, and Reading. Pearl Street station in Malden closed on December 27, 1975 concurrent with the opening of the Orange Line's  station; a commuter platform at Malden Center - the first high-level platform on the commuter system - opened on May 1, 1977 but closed again in September 1979.

In November 1974, North Andover and Andover declined to renew their subsidies. Service to North Andover station ended on November 15. Days before, Andover commuters and businesses raised funds to continue service until April 1975. On April 7, 1975, town residents voted "overwhelmingly" to reimburse the commuters and subsidize service for an additional year. The town declined to subsidize further service, and the three Andover stops (Shawsheen, and ) were dropped effective April 2, 1976. The MBTA bought all B&M commuter equipment and lines on December 27, 1976, including the Western Route from Wilmington Junction to the New Hampshire border.

Restoration 

Despite the passenger cutbacks, the upper Western Route remained in use by freight. Weekday service was restored to Haverhill via Reading with funding from the Merrimack Valley Regional Transit Authority on December 17, 1979. Station stops resumed at North Wilmington, Ballardvale, Andover, Shawsheen, Lawrence, Bradford, and Haverhill but not North Andover. Weekend service to Haverhill began on April 27, 1980, but Shawsheen station was closed.

On January 20, 1984, a fire destroyed the wooden trestles approaching the Charles River Bridge. Haverhill/Reading Line trains ran to the normally-unused platform at Oak Grove for transfer to the Orange Line during the disruption.  Oak Grove was discontinued as a regular stop when North Station and the drawbridges reopened on April 20, 1985, but the platform at Malden Center was permanently reopened for transfer purposes. The switch may have been made due to a request by John A. Brennan Jr., who was then constructing a large development near Malden Center station.

Daily ridership on the line increased from 2,955 in 1991 to 4,970 in 2001. On December 14, 2001, Amtrak's Downeaster service began operating from Boston to Portland, Maine. The Downeaster runs via the lower Lowell Line and the Wildcat Branch then the Western Route, with a stop at Haverhill. Around this time, some rush-hour Haverhill trains began using the Wildcat Branch to avoid interference from Reading local trains. On December 5, 2005, the new McGovern Transportation Center replaced the old Lawrence station.

2010s improvement projects

Double tracking

Due to the Reading line being single-tracked along the Orange Line corridor in the 1970s, and most double track removed north of Wilmington after the 1976 discontinuation, the Haverhill Line has the most single track on the MBTA system. In early 2009, the MBTA began planning the addition of double track between Reading and Ballardvale that summer. Those plans fell through, but later that year the MBTA was awarded $51.5 million of stimulus funding for a variety of projects, including $10.2 million for the addition of double track from one mile north of Ballardvale to Andover Street in Lawrence, as well as $7.2 million for signal upgrades. The double tracking will increase capacity on the section of the line shared with freight service, increasing reliability and allowing for possible travel time decreases for the Downeaster. The second track was not extended through Ballardvale station due to limited space for a second platform, but Andover station was to receive a second platform and possibly additional parking following the removal of a town vehicle yard. 

Work started in April 2010; a groundbreaking was held in May 2010 with completion then estimated for February 2012. Due to funding issues and construction delays, the work was not finished in 2012. By late 2013, a  stone wall at Andover station had been replaced, along with a century-old culvert, as part of drainage improvements. Construction of the track and crossovers was partially complete; the signal system was largely finished. After more delays, the project was completed around 2017. However, second platforms were not built at Andover and Ballardvale, limiting the usefulness of the second track for the MBTA. Instead, Pan Am Railways often uses the second track in Andover to idle freight trains.

In 2011, the Northern New England Passenger Rail Authority won a $20.8 million federal grant to add additional double track from Wilmington Junction to just south of Ballardvale station. This second section of double track is largely for use by Downeaster trains but may benefit MBTA trains using the Wildcat Branch as well. The $26.0 million project (including a $5.2 million match from the MBTA) included 14,100 feet of new double main, rebuilt interlockings at Wilmington Junction and Lowell Junction, a maintenance-of-way siding at Wilmington Junction, preparing three grade crossings on the Wildcat Branch for future double tracking, and replacement of 5 miles of old track between Lawrence and Bradford. Work began in 2012 and was completed around 2017.

Bridges

Several bridges on the line were in poor condition, including the twelve-span, -long bridge over the Merrimack River between Bradford and Haverhill. A single-track covered bridge was built in 1839, and was replaced with a two-track steel truss bridge on the same piers in 1881. A temporary one-track wooden trestle was constructed to the west of the bridge; the truss spans were jacked up  at a time while the masonry piers were built up under them. The truss spans were replaced in 1919, again reusing the piers; the northern approach over Washington Street was replaced in 1928. In 2008, the MBTA began a $3 million project to repair the bridge.

In 2010, the state applied for $110.8 million in federal funding to replace the bridge, but the request was denied in May 2011. In December 2011, the state received $10 million in TIGER stimulus funds to aid in rehabilitation of the bridge, then to cost $43 million. The MBTA awarded a $23.9 million contract for the first phase in early 2014, with construction expected to last from April 2014 to April 2017. By 2014, the total cost was expected to reach $100 million. Some off-peak trains were substituted with buses during the repairs, and service was suspended on six weekends between September 2014 and November 2016. The second phase of bridge reconstruction - repairs to the piers - lasted from 2016 to 2019. Additional scour protection work was completed in 2021.

Repairs were also made to two smaller arch bridges over the Shawsheen River in Andover, both dating to the line's opening in 1839. The historic bridges were no longer able to support modern train loads; instead, fill was removed from the arch and modern flat steel bridges placed inside them. The steel bridges carry the train loads so that the stone arches need merely support their own weight. The $10.9 million project began in September 2012, with substantial completion in September 2013 and full completion a year later.

Plaistow extension proposal and layovers
Prior to 1987, when the system was operated by B&M successor Guilford Transportation Industries, trains were stored overnight on Guilford-owned sidings north of Haverhill station in a largely industrial area. When the MBTA contracted with Amtrak in 1987 to operate the system, a new layover yard for the line was needed. The MBTA constructed a two-track layover yard adjacent to a rebuilt Bradford station at a cost of $2.2 million. It was built without an environmental evaluation process in violation of state law; not until 1992 did complaints from residents prompt the MBTA to belatedly start the process. Because of its proximity to the Bradford residential neighborhood, the noise and diesel fumes from the layover have prompted continued complaint from residents. 

In 2008, Massachusetts entered negotiations to buy property in Plaistow, New Hampshire for a layover yard (to replace the undersized Bradford layover) and a new station. Funding was available, and Plaistow was potentially interested, but wanted to better understand the potential drawbacks of being the location of the layover station. By August 2010, both states said that they were close to reaching a deal that would allow trains to operate over the proposed expansion.

Plaistow residents voted down one extension possibility in 2012, but the extension remained on the table. In August 2013, the New Hampshire Department of Transportation began another study of layover and station sites. A number of station and layover site options were presented in May 2014, and three final options were released in September 2014: a station and layover just past NH-125, a station there with the layover moved just south of the state line, and a station and layover near NH-121A. However, the Plaistow Board of Selectmen voted for the "no build" option to not extend commuter rail to the town in April 2015.

, the MBTA plans to relocate and expand the layover facility in the mid-to-late 2020s.

Recent changes
The line was shut down on weekends in September through December 2017 for the installation of Positive Train Control equipment in order to meet a 2020 federal deadline. Substantially reduced schedules due to the COVID-19 pandemic were in effect from March 16 to June 23, 2020, and from December 14, 2020, to April 5, 2021. On January 23, 2021, reduced schedules went into place with no weekend service on seven lines, including the Haverhill Line. Weekend service on the seven lines resumed on July 3, 2021.

Continuous welded rail was installed on an  section between Fells Interlocking in Malden and the Ipswich River in Wilmington from September to November 2021. Most off-peak service between Reading and North Station was cancelled, with many Haverhill trains operating using the Wildcat Branch. In June 2022, the MBTA indicated plans to add a second track at Reading station by 2023, allowing 30-minute headways between Boston and Reading. Hourly service to Haverhill was also being studied. A second track and platform at Ballardvale is planned.

, the line has 13 Boston–Haverhill round trips and  Boston–Reading round trips on weekdays, with two inbound and one outbound Haverhill train using the Wildcat Branch. Weekend service has eight Boston–Haverhill round trips. During the closure of the Orange Line from August 19 to September 18, 2022, all Haverhill Line trains stopped at Oak Grove. It was retained as a permanent Haverhill Line stop after the closure. By October 2022, the line had 5,806 daily riders; this represented 82% of pre-COVID ridership, the second-highest percentage on the system.

Station listing
Mileages to the New Hampshire stations are via the Wildcat Branch and Wilmington –  longer than the mainline through Reading – which was the route used at the time of discontinuance.

References

External links 

MBTA - Haverhill Line
Shawsheen River Bridges project
Merrimack River Bridge project

MBTA Commuter Rail